Eugene Patrick Glynn (born September 22, 1956, at Waseca, Minnesota) is an American professional baseball coach and a former minor league manager and second baseman. He was the  infield and baserunning coordinator of the Miami Marlins of Major League Baseball, and previously served as third base coach of the Minnesota Twins from 2015–18. He also has held coaching positions with four other MLB teams.

Glynn graduated from Waseca High School and Minnesota State University, Mankato (then called Mankato State University), where he starred in both baseball and basketball. He was Minnesota's first "Mr. Basketball" in 1975.

Glynn was signed as a non-drafted free agent by the Montreal Expos in 1979 and played seven seasons in Montreal's farm system, including parts of three campaigns (1982–84) at the Triple A level. His rookie season, in the 1979 New York–Penn League, was his best, with 36 runs batted in in 64 games played, 71 runs scored, and a batting average of .296.  He managed five seasons (1987–88; 1990–92) in Short Season-A baseball, beginning in the New York–Penn League. His 1990 Spokane Indians, a San Diego Padres affiliate, won the Northwest League championship.

Bob Gebhard, the scout who signed Glynn for the Expos in 1979, was the first general manager in the history of the Colorado Rockies, and he brought Glynn into the expansion team's system in 1992. By , Glynn was on the coaching staff of the Major League Rockies, serving for five full seasons, through . He then returned to the Expos for one season as an MLB coach, then spent longer tenures as the third-base coach of the Chicago Cubs (2000–02) and San Francisco Giants (–06).

Glynn spent the 2007–11 seasons as a member of the professional scouting staff of the Tampa Bay Rays, based in Waseca.

In 2012, Glynn joined the Twins' organization as manager of the Triple-A Rochester Red Wings.

As a result of his success, Glynn was interviewed for the parent Twins' vacant managerial opening in October 2014, after the firing of veteran skipper Ron Gardenhire.  Baseball Hall of Famer Paul Molitor ultimately was hired as the Twins' 2015 pilot, and he added Glynn to his first-year staff as third-base coach.

In , he joined the Marlins as infield and baserunning coordinator.

Glynn retired from baseball after the  season. On May 4, 2021, Glynn was announced as the head boys basketball coach at St. Clair High School in St. Clair, Minnesota. He coached the team during the 2021-2022 season and announced he would be stepping down as head coach at the end of the season.

References
 Howe News Bureau, 1985 Montreal Expos Organization Book. St. Petersburg, Florida: The Baseball Library, 1985

External links

 Retrosheet

1956 births
Living people
Baseball players from Minnesota
Chicago Cubs coaches
Colorado Rockies (baseball) coaches
Colorado Rockies scouts
Indianapolis Indians players
Jacksonville Suns players
Jamestown Expos players
Major League Baseball third base coaches
Memphis Chicks players
Miami Marlins coaches
Minnesota State Mavericks baseball players
Minnesota State Mavericks men's basketball players
Minnesota Twins coaches
Minor league baseball managers
Montreal Expos coaches
People from Waseca, Minnesota
Rochester Red Wings managers
San Francisco Giants coaches
Spokane Indians managers
Tampa Bay Rays scouts
West Palm Beach Expos players
Wichita Aeros players
American men's basketball players
Minnesota State University, Mankato alumni